Lindsay George Drake (7 September 1949 – 21 June 2019) was an Australian rugby league footballer who played in the 1970s.

Playing career
A lock forward, Drake was graded with Manly-Warringah Sea Eagles and played two seasons with them between 1970–1971 and played in the 1970 Grand Final. Drake then shifted to St George Dragons for four seasons between 1972 and 1975, his last game being the 1975 Grand Final. He returned to Manly in 1977 and played with them until the end of 1979 before retiring.

Drake represented New South Wales in one game in 1971, that being his only representative appearance.

Death
Drake died on 21 June 2019.

References

Manly Warringah Sea Eagles players
St. George Dragons players
Australian rugby league players
2019 deaths
New South Wales rugby league team players
1949 births
Rugby league locks